The term flee may refer to:
Flee (album), an album by Jeremy Spencer
Flee, or run away, the flight option of the fight-or-flight response
Flee, withdrawal (military) or retreat from battle
 Flee the Seen, an American band nicknamed "Flee"
 Flee (film), a 2021 Danish animated documentary film

See also
Flea (disambiguation)
Flée (disambiguation), several French communes